QTV may refer to:

Television channels, stations and networks
TNQ – the former branding for Southern Cross Ten in regional Queensland, Australia was QTV
ARY Qtv, the Pakistani Islamic television network Quran TV
WDCQ-TV, the name of WDCQ-TV, a PBS member station, owned and operated by Delta College in Michigan
Q TV, a British music television channel based on and cobranded with the music magazine Q
Quality TeleVision or QTV, a defunct television network in the Philippines or Q television network

Other
QTV, American subsidiary of Autocue, the UK manufacturer of teleprompting equipment
Little Joe II Qualification Test Vehicle, Qualification Test Vehicle known as the Little Joe Rocket
Q.T.V., a defunct collegiate fraternity in the Northeastern United States